Charles Stoffel (5 April 1893 – 30 July 1970) was a Swiss sportsman. He competed in the four-man bobsleigh event at the 1924 Winter Olympics and 1928 Winter Olympics. He also competed in the equestrian events at the 1924 Summer Olympics and the 1928 Summer Olympics.

See also
 List of athletes who competed in both the Summer and Winter Olympic games

References

External links
 

1893 births
1970 deaths
Swiss male bobsledders
Swiss male equestrians
Olympic bobsledders of Switzerland
Olympic equestrians of Switzerland
Bobsledders at the 1924 Winter Olympics
Bobsledders at the 1928 Winter Olympics
Equestrians at the 1924 Summer Olympics
Equestrians at the 1928 Summer Olympics
Sportspeople from St. Gallen (city)
20th-century Swiss people